These are tables of congressional delegations from South Dakota to the United States Senate and United States House of Representatives.

The current dean of the South Dakota delegation is Senator and Senate Minority Whip John Thune, having served in the Senate since 2005, and previously serving in the House from 1997 until 2003.

United States Senate

U.S. House of Representatives

Key

See also

 List of United States congressional districts
 South Dakota's congressional districts
Political party strength in South Dakota

References

Politics of South Dakota
South Dakota
 
 
Congressional delegations